Harpendyreus aequatorialis, the equatorial mountain blue, is a butterfly in the family Lycaenidae. It is found in Kenya, Tanzania and the Democratic Republic of the Congo. The habitat consists of montane grassland and moorland.

Subspecies
Harpendyreus aequatorialis aequatorialis (Kenya)
Harpendyreus aequatorialis vulcanica (Joicey & Talbot, 1924) (Tanzania: north to the highlands, Democratic Republic of the Congo: Ruwenzori Mountains)

References

Butterflies described in 1892
Harpendyreus
Butterflies of Africa